Juan Carlos García Pajero (born January 4, 1971 in Caracas, Venezuela) is a Venezuelan actor and model known for starring in various protagonist roles in telenovelas for RCTV and Venevisión.

Biography
García completed his primary education at San Ignacio Secondary school and in the Villanueva School where he obtained his bachelor's degree. Soon, he began studying Mechanical Engineering at Universidad Metropolitana. But two years later he decided to switch to Civil Engineering at the Universidad Santa María.

His career began after he was spotted when he accompanied his girlfriend for a TV commercial casting. After trying out modelling, he landed his first commercial and became an instant success in Venezuela. He modeled for prominent fashion brands such as Tommy Hilfiger, Christian Dior, Giovanni Scutaro, among others.

After a successful modelling career, García decided to venture into acting, obtaining his first acting role in the telenovela Jugando a ganar.

In December 2011, García married fellow actress Yuvanna Montalvo in an intimate ceremony at Isla Margarita.

Filmography

Films

Television

References

External links
 
 JUAN CARLOS GARCÍA at 
 

1971 births
Living people
Male actors from Caracas
Venezuelan male telenovela actors
20th-century Venezuelan male actors
21st-century Venezuelan male actors
Universidad Santa María (Venezuela) alumni